The 2019 Women's U25 Wheelchair Basketball World Championship was held at the Suphanburi Indoor Stadium in Thailand, from 23 to 27 May 2019. It was the third wheelchair basketball world championship for women in the under-25 age category. Eight nations competed: Australia, Germany, Great Britain, Japan, Thailand, South Africa, Turkey and the United States. The event took the form of a round-robin tournament, with each team playing all the other teams once. The eight teams then went into quarter-finals, while the bottom two played each other for world ranking. The winners of the semi-finals faced each other in the final, while the losers played for bronze. The competition was won by the United States, with Australia taking silver and Great Britain claiming bronze.

Competition
The 2019 Women's U25 Wheelchair Basketball World Championship was the third wheelchair basketball world championship for women in the under-25 age category. The event is held every four years; it was previously held in St. Catharines, Ontario, Canada, in 2011, and in Beijing, China, in 2015. Thailand was chosen as the host in November 2018.

Eight nations competed:  Australia, Germany, Great Britain, Japan, Thailand, South Africa, Turkey and the United States. The teams were divided into two pools. A draw ceremony was conducted in Bangkok on 1 April 2019,  presided over by Ulf Mehrens, the President of the International Wheelchair Basketball Federation (IWBF), and Chutinant Bhirombhakdi, the President of the Paralympic Committee of Thailand. Great Britain, Japan, South Africa and Thailand were assigned to Pool A, and Australia, Germany, Turkey and the United States to Pool B. The competition format called for the teams to play each team in their pool. Based on the rankings, they then played a finals series. Because there was only eight teams, all advanced to the quarter-finals. The schedule was released in April 2019.

Venue
The event was held at the Suphanburi Indoor Stadium, a 4,000-seat stadium in the heart of Suphanburi.

Teams

Head Coach: Stephen Charlton
Assistant Coach: Sarah Graham
Assistant/Technical: Dave Hegerty
Physiotherapist: Bonnie Kerr
Team Manager: Jane Kyle
Physiologist: Steph Shell

Source:

Nthombizile Nthombeni: Head Coach
James Mthethwa: Assistant Coach
Gerhard Smith: Team Manager
Kate Douglas: Sport Massage
Wiseman Dlamini: Second Assistant Coach
Charles Saunders: Chef De Mission

Source:

Dennis Nohl : Trainer
Marina Mohnen :  Assistant Trainer
Franziska Vogel : Physical Therapist
Mathis Garvels : Physiotherapist
Leutheuser :  Team Doctor 
Marie Scheidemann : Technician

Source:

Head Coach: Ali Arda Ozturk
Assistant Coach: Tawatchai Jaisin
Team Manager: Wootisak Pinwiset
Assistant Coach: Akapo Kunpradit
Assistant Coach: Erdener Atalan

Source:

Daniel Price: Head Coach
Simon Fisher: Assistant Coach
Rosie Williams: Team Manager
Laura Heathcote: Physiotherapist
Nathan Payne: Performance Analyst
Andrew Hogg: Doctor
Tanakom Sheepsomsong: Mechanic
Jayne Ellis: Performance Director

Source:

Murat Saltan: Head Coach
Abdullah Bayram: Assistant Coach
Önder Yurdagül: Team-Manager
Ayça Uyan: Physiotherapist
Servet Ergün: Mechanic
Seyhan Candan: Companion

Source:

Sayaka Yamasaki: Head Coach
Erika Yoshida: Assistant Coach
Jun Nomura: Trainer
Takumi Saito: Trainer
Miho Yoshikawa: Team Staff
Keigo Hirata: Analyst
Nuriya  Narita: Interpreter
Yurie Miyamoto: Secretary General 

Source:

Lawerance "Trooper" Johnson: Head Coach
Melanie Brionez: Assistant Coach
Mieko Chambers: Assistant Coach
Trice Ham: Team Manager
Karla Francioni: Athletic Trainer

Source: 

The South African team was named on 8 May. The team included many players who were new to the sport, and some had never travelled on a plane before. The team officials were under no illusions about the difficulty of winning games, but saw the tournament as an opportunity to build their wheelchair basketball program, with an eye to qualifying for the 2024 Summer Paralympics in Paris. Similarly, the Australian U25 team, known as the Devils, was unashamedly a development team, with only one of its eleven players being a member of the senior team, the Gliders: Annabelle Lindsay, who had played in the 2018 Wheelchair Basketball World Championship in Hamburg in 2018. Most of the youthful side would be eligible to play in the next U25 championship, and three would be eligible to play in the next three. In contrast, Team Great Britain regarded itself as a serious contender, having won in Beijing in 2015, and the U24 European Wheelchair Basketball Championship in 2016 and 2018. The team included five members of the senior team:  Joy Haizelden,  Maddie Thompson, Kayla Bell, Siobhan Fitzpatrick and Charlotte Moore.

Preliminary round

The first day opened well for South Africa, which scored its first ever win in the competition, with a 16-35 win over the host nation. Team GB got off to a shaky start against Japan, but claimed a 47-30 win. The Devils performed well against Germany, with Lindsay racking up 27 points and 12 rebounds in a 55-37 win. On the final game of the day, the USA was too good for Turkey.  On the second day, Japan notched up its first win, against South Africa; the USA had little trouble with Germany; the Devils held Turkey to a scoreless 11-0 first quarter before going on to post a second win; and Team GB coasted to an easy win against Thailand. On the third day, Germany defeated Turkey 46-24 to secure the third spot in Pool B, and Japan defeated Thailand to grab second place in Pool A. With another easy victory, this time 80-12 over South Africa, Team GB claimed the top spot in Pool A. The final game of the round was a fight for the top spot in Pool B between the Devils and the USA. The USA concentrated on shutting down Lindsay, who had been averaging 35 points per game. This time she scored only 10 points, but Teisha Shadwell also proved a threat, and ended the game with a double-double of 11 points and 12 rebounds. When the USA rotated its players, the Devils began to gain the upper hand, winning the third quarter by two points. In the end, the USA won 56-31, and, undefeated, secured the top place in Pool B.

Standings at end of playoff round

Pool A

Pool B

Finals

 Quarter-Final 1

 Quarter-Final 2

 Quarter-Final 3

 Quarter-Final 4

 5/8 Crossover 1

 5/8 Crossover 2

 Semi-Final 1

 Semi-Final 2

 7th/8th place game

 5th/6th place game

 Bronze medal match

 Gold medal match 

In the quarter-finals, Japan staged a thrilling 18-8 final quarter fight back to defeat Germany 42-37. In a hard-fought match, Japan's pressure held Germany to a dismal 19 percent scoring efficiency, while Amane Yanagimoto racked up 21 points, and Kotone Usui had a double-double with 10 points and 17 rebounds. It was Japan's first ever quarter-final win, and ensured its highest ever ranking. For the Devils it would be their third semi-final appearance, with their place locked in with a 72-12 demolition of South Africa. Lindsay posted a double-double of 32 points and 24 rebounds, Georgia Bishop-Cash and Jess Cronje also posted double-doubles, and most of the rest of the team made the scoreboard. A brave Thailand held the USA to just 31 points at half time, its lowest half-time score of the tournament, but could not stop them, and the USA went into the semi-finals undaunted, posting a final score of 65-10. In the last quarter-final, Team GB defeated Turkey 70-15, with four players scoring in the double digits.

In the crossover games, Germany bounced back from its defeat by Japan to defeat Thailand 52-14, and Turkey celebrated its first ever win, a 48-25 victory over South Africa. In the first semi-final, the USA beat Japan 78-24. In the second, the Devils came up against the undefeated Team GB. Both sides subjected the other to intense defensive pressure, with Team GB forcing the Devils into a series of eight second violations. Maddie Thompson was pulled off after she racked up three personal fouls, and the British defence struggled with height of Lindsay and Shadwell. A three-point buzzer beater from Joy Haizelden left Team GB just two points down at half time, but the Devils pushed their lead out to four points by three quarter time. Team GB's press forced multiple turnovers, but the Devils' pressure caused Team GB to miss many shots, and they ended with an average shooting accuracy of just 22 percent. In the end, Team GB's undefeated run ended, and the Devils were into the final with a 42-36 win.

South Africa won the 7th/8th place game against Thailand, Germany defeated Turkey in the 5th/6th place game, and Team GB rallied after its defeat by the Devils to claim the bronze medal with a win over Japan. In the anticlimactic final game, Lindsay lined up against five of her team mates from the University of Texas at Arlington Lady Movin' Mavs wheelchair basketball team: Nina Welfle, Rose Hollermann, Abby Dunkin, Josie Aslakson and Elizabeth Becker. The USA were too good, posting a 62-25 win. It was the USA's second win, and the Devil's third silver in a row.

MVP and All Stars
The 2019 Women’s U25 World Championship All-Star Five was announced at the closing banquet on the final night of the tournament at the Songphanburi Hotel, in Suphanburi. The All-Star Five is made up of the best 1 point player, 2 point player, 3 point player and 4 point player, plus the Most Valuable Player of the Tournament, as voted by their fellow competitors.

All Star Five
 
 
 
 
Source:

Most Valuable Player
 
Source:

Notes

External links
 Official website

Women's U25 Wheelchair Basketball World Championship
International women's basketball competitions hosted by Thailand
Sport in Suphan Buri province